Ange Auguste Joseph de Laborde de Marchainville (7 July 1766, Paris - 13 July 1786, in the Baie des Français, Lituya, Alaska) was a French explorer. He was a member of the La Perouse expedition on which he died.

His father was the very rich court banker Jean-Joseph de Laborde, fermier général from 1759 to 1768, and a major figure in the financial, political and fashionable circles of the day.  After Ange and his brother Édouard  died on the Lapérouse expedition, Jean-Joseph and his wife raised a blue-turquoise marble rostral column beside a pool at his château de Méréville, decorated with 4 ships' bows, to glorify their virtues.

External links
His genealogy on geneanet samlap

1766 births
1786 deaths
French explorers
18th-century explorers
18th-century French people